Valdimar Grímsson (born 5 December 1965) is an Icelandic former handball player who competed in the 1992 Summer Olympics.

References

1965 births
Living people
Valdimar Grimsson
Valdimar Grimsson
Handball players at the 1992 Summer Olympics
Knattspyrnufélag Akureyrar handball players